The 1995 European Cup was the 31st edition of the European Cup, IIHF's premier European club ice hockey tournament. The season started on September, 1995, and finished on December 30, 1995.

The tournament was won by Jokerit, who beat Kölner Haie in the final.

Preliminary round

First group round

Group A
(Sofia, Bulgaria)

Group A standings

Group B
(Budapest, Hungary)

Group B standings

Group C
(Herning, Denmark)

Group C standings

Group D
(Tilburg, Netherlands)

Group D standings

 Podhale Nowy Targ,
 VEU Feldkirch,
 Storhamar,
 HC Bolzano,
 Rouen HC,
 EHC Kloten,
 TPS,
 TJ VSŽ Košice,
 HC Petra Vsetín,
 Dynamo Moscow,  HV71   :  bye

Second group round

Group E
(Hamar, Norway)

Group E standings

Group F
(Kloten, Canton of Zürich, Switzerland)

Group F standings

Group G
(Bolzano, Italy)

Group G standings

Group H
(Vsetín, Czech Republic)

Group H standings

 Kölner Haie,
 Jokerit     :  bye

Final stage
(Cologne, North Rhine-Westphalia, Germany)

Third round

Group J

Group J standings

Group K

Group K standings

Third place match

Final

References
 Season 1995

1
IIHF European Cup